Igors Semjonovs (born 3 July 1985) is a Latvian football midfielder, currently playing for the Latvian First League club FB Gulbene.

Semjonovs has appeared for the Latvia national football team.

References

External links

1985 births
Living people
Footballers from Riga
Latvian footballers
Skonto FC players
FK Daugava (2003) players
FB Gulbene players
Latvia international footballers
Latvian people of Russian descent
FK RFS players
Association football midfielders